Guy Melamed is the name of:

Guy Melamed (footballer, born 1979), Israeli footballer
Guy Melamed (footballer, born 1992), Israeli footballer